Riesbeck's Food Markets, also known as simply Riesbeck's, is an American chain of 17 grocery stores located in Ohio and West Virginia. It is headquartered in St. Clairsville, Ohio. As of April, 2021, five of their stores also include pharmacies.

In the 1920s with the death of Clement Riesbeck. His wife Margret (Schumacher) Riesbeck decided to relocate after his passing to Woodsfield, Ohio. In order to support her family, Margret opened the “corner grocery” store in 1925. Then in 1932, “Grandma”, as Margaret was known, opened the first “Riesbeck’s in Martins Ferry.

The company is employee-owned (with a majority of the company's stock owned by its employees). It was ranked the 96th largest employee-owned company on the National Center for Employee Ownership's 2016 Employee Ownership 100 list, with 1,260 employees.

References

https://www.wetzelchronicle.com/opinion/columns-by-chuck-clegg/2020/11/11/through-the-lens-welcome-riesbecks-to-our-community/

External links
 Official website

Supermarkets of the United States
Retail companies established in 1936
1936 establishments in Ohio
Employee-owned companies of the United States